Corporate sustainability is an approach aiming to create long-term stakeholder value through the implementation of a business strategy that focuses on the ethical, social, environmental, cultural, and economic dimensions of doing business. The strategies created are intended to foster longevity, transparency, and proper employee development within business organizations. Firms will often express their commitment to corporate sustainability through a statement of Corporate Sustainability Standards (CSS), which are usually policies and measures that aim to meet, or exceed, minimum regulatory requirements.

Corporate sustainability is often confused with corporate social responsibility (CSR), though the two are not the same. Bansal and DesJardine (2014) state that the notion of 'time' discriminates sustainability from CSR and other similar concepts. Whereas ethics, morality, and norms permeate CSR, sustainability only obliges businesses to make intertemporal trade-offs to safeguard intergenerational equity. Short-termism is the bane of sustainability.

Origin 
The phrase is derived from the concept of "sustainable development" and Elkington's (1997) "triple bottom line." The Brundtland Commission's Report, Our Common Future, described sustainable development as, "development that meets the needs of the present without compromising the ability of future generations to meet their own needs." This desire to grow without damaging future generations' prospects gradually became central to business philosophies.

"Triple bottom line" proposes that business goals were inseparable from the societies and environments within which they operate. While short-term economic gains could be pursued, failure to account the social and environmental impacts of these pursuits is believed to make those business practices unsustainable.

Measuring corporate sustainability is possible through composite indicators that cover environmental, social, corporate governance and economic measures. One way of assessing corporate sustainability is through the Complex Performance Indicator (CPI).

Scope 
The most broadly accepted criterion for corporate sustainability constitutes a firm's efficient use of natural capital.  This eco-efficiency is usually calculated as the economic value added by a firm in relation to its aggregated ecological impact.

Similar to the eco-efficiency concept but so far less explored is the second criterion for corporate sustainability. Socio-efficiency describes the relation between a firm's value added and its social impact. Whereas, it can be assumed that most corporate impacts on the environment are negative (apart from rare exceptions such as the planting of trees) this is not true for social impacts. These can be either positive (e.g. corporate giving, creation of employment) or negative (e.g. work accidents, human rights abuses).

Both eco-efficiency and socio-efficiency are concerned primarily with increasing economic sustainability. In this process they instrumentalise both natural and social capital aiming to benefit from win-win situations. Some point towards eco-effectiveness, socio-effectiveness, sufficiency, and eco-equity as four criteria that need to be met if sustainable development is to be reached.

Theorists agree that respect for issues other than economics is an important matter. The Business Case for Sustainability (BCS) has had many different approaches for ways to approve or disapprove the economic rationale for corporate sustainability management.

Principles for corporate sustainability

Transparency proposes that by having an engaging environment within a company and within the community it operates will improve performance and increase profits. This can be attained through open communications with stakeholders characterized by high levels of information disclosure, clarity, and accuracy.
Stakeholder engagement is attained when a company educates its employees and outside stakeholders (customers, suppliers, and the entire community) and move them to act on matters such as waste reduction or energy efficiency.
Thinking ahead Envisioning the future enables companies to generate fresh ideas for implementation. These ideas can either reduce productions costs, increase profits, or provide a better image for the organization. 
Increasing the number of women board members A a 2012 study by the University of California Berkeley's Haas School of Business found that companies with a high number of female board members were more likely to reduce their environmental impact and improve energy efficiency.

See also

 Sustainable business
 Sustainable finance
 Project finance
 EthicalQuote (CEQ)
Environmental, social and corporate governance
 Index of sustainability articles

References

Sources 
 
 
 
 
 Werbach, Adam. Strategy for Sustainability: a Business Manifesto. Boston, Mass.: Harvard Business, 2009. Print.
 "Strengthen Your Business by Developing Your Employees", by Leslie Levine—Business Resources, Advice and Forms for Large and Small Businesses, 2010
 "Walmart Sustainability Report 2010 – Environment – Waste." Walmartstores.com. Web. 1 July 2010.
 "Handbook on Corporate Social Responsibility in India", Sachin Shukla et al – PwC India, 2013.

External links
 International Society of Sustainability Professionals – Non-profit association supporting sustainability professionals